Sons of Perdition is a 2010 documentary film featuring a behind-the-scenes look into the lives of teenagers exiled from their families and community by Warren Jeffs, self-proclaimed prophet of the  Fundamentalist Church of Jesus Christ of Latter Day Saints (FLDS Church).  Sons of Perdition premiered at the Tribeca Film Festival in New York on April 24, 2010,  having sold out at the box office within one hour from the time tickets went on sale.

Background 
"Sons of perdition"  is a term used by some Latter Day Saint denominations, including the FLDS Church, to describe former members who have apostatized from their religion and faith. The term is derogatory and intended to convey unholiness, sin and evil.  Within the FLDS Church in the border towns of Colorado City, Arizona, and Hildale, Utah, under the severe rule of convicted pedophile Warren Jeffs, hundreds of teenage boys were exiled from their homes and families among the FLDS faithful for infractions such as wearing short-sleeved shirts, listening to music or talking to girls.   Whether forced out by church leadership or a deliberate choice to escape the harsh environment, the exiled teenage boys were shunned by their families and community. As a result of their limited education and lifelong insulation from the world apart from their polygamous community, these "lost boys" were ill-equipped to manage life on the outside of the church.  Many of the youngsters turned to drugs or alcohol to cope with the traumatic separation; others found themselves in trouble with the law.

Directors Tyler Measom and Jennilynn Merten followed these Lost Boys for four years to bring to the film the personal perspective of the exiled boys.   As described by one film reviewer:

Sons of Perdition's concentration on Joe, Bruce, and Sam—and, to a lesser extent, their exiled compatriots—is a shrewd one, allowing for a focused examination of the toll wrought by such an upbringing on teens undergoing the process of self-definition. Less a definitive historical account of American polygamy than a study of a very particular strain of post-traumatic stress disorder, Measom and Merten's doc is cautiously inspiring in its snapshot of independence blossoming amidst oppression, heartbreaking in its empathetic portrayal of lost young men permanently scarred by their elders, and infuriating in its clear-sighted depiction of the criminal and emotional horrors perpetrated in the service of religious psychosis.
Measom and Merten found the subject matter appealing in part because of their own experience of having abandoned  the Mormon  faith they grew up in.

Cast 
The documentary features three teenage boys, Sam Zitting, Joseph Broadbent, and Bruce Barlow.  At the time of filming, all three were  living in St. George, Utah, having left the dictates of Warren Jeffs and the FLDS Church, whose members resided in the Arizona–Utah twin cities of Colorado City and Hildale (known also as the Crick or Short Creek).   The film also features Utah private investigator Sam Brower.

Release
On April 24, 2010 Sons of Perdition  made its debut at the Tribeca Film Festival premiere in New York.

At the 2010 AFI-Discovery SilverDocs Documentary Film Festival, Sons of Perdition was selected for the Sterling U.S. Feature Competition.

Sons of Perdition was acquired by the Oprah Winfrey Network and was broadcast in June 2011.

See also 
 Outer darkness
 Prophet's Prey
Keep Sweet: Pray and Obey

 Notes 

References

Tribeca Film Guide: Sons of Perdition
MovingPictures Review: Sons of Perdition(Directors Tyler Measom and Jennilyn Merten follow the boys as they try to find a home, and, while the boys remain relentlessly openhearted and somehow innocent, they’re also slowly learning to close off their hearts from intimate contact with anyone.)
Tribeca Film Festival:  Faces of the Festival(Tyler Measom and Jennilyn Merten became much more than outsiders and filmmakers. Sons of Perdition is an emotionally engaging and shocking look at the FLDS Church through the eyes of Sam, Joe, and Bruce, three teens who decided that life inside the Crick, aka Colorado City, AZ, among the strict polygamists under Warren Jeffs' control, was not what they wanted for themselves)
(Sons of Perdition selected to premiere at World Documentary Competition: For a group of teenage boys, the desire for autonomy means banishment from their homes and families)
Nick Shager Review: Sons of Perdition(...snapshot of independence blossoming amidst oppression, heartbreaking in its empathetic portrayal of lost young men permanently scarred by their elders, and infuriating in its clear-sighted depiction of the criminal and emotional horrors perpetrated in the service of religious psychosis'')
Joseph Smigelski Synopsis via Huffington Post
Tribeca Film Festival World Documentary Features

External links 
 
 
 Tribeca Film Festival Official Site

2010 films
2010 in Christianity
2010 documentary films
American documentary films
Child abandonment
Documentary films critical of the Fundamentalist Church of Jesus Christ of Latter-Day Saints
Films about child abuse
Documentary films about polygamy
Films about prophets
Mormonism-related controversies
Works about polygamy in Mormonism
Works about religion and children
Works about Mormon fundamentalism
2010s English-language films
2010s American films